Forest Range can refer to:
 Forest range, an administrative divisional unit used in managing forests in India, Pakistan and Bangladesh
 Forest Range, South Australia, a town in Australia
 Forest Range (New Zealand) a range of hills, part of the Catlins Ranges, South Island, New Zealand